Thomas Joseph Dowling (28 February 1840 – 6 August 1924) was a Canadian Catholic priest and the second Bishop of the Catholic Diocese of Peterborough and the fourth Bishop of the Catholic Diocese of Hamilton, Ontario.

Biography
He was born in Ireland, and educated at St. Michael's College, Toronto. He was parish-priest at Paris, Ontario, for 22 years, administrator of the diocese of Hamilton in 1883, he was named bishop of Peterborough in 1887 and on May 1, received his episcopal consecration at St. Mary's Cathedral, Hamilton, from Archbishop John Joseph Lynch, C.M., with Bishops James Joseph Carbery and Thomas Timothy O'Mahony serving as co-consecrators. He was transferred to the bishopric of Hamilton in 1889.

References

External links
 Catholic-Hierarchy entry

1840 births
1924 deaths
Roman Catholic bishops of Peterborough
Irish emigrants to Canada (before 1923)
19th-century Roman Catholic bishops in Canada
20th-century Roman Catholic bishops in Canada
Roman Catholic bishops of Hamilton, Ontario